Henri Boulad, SJ (born August 28, 1931) is a Lebanese-Egyptian priest in the Jesuit order, author, and commentator living in Egypt. He is a member of the Melkite Greek Catholic Church.

Biography
Henri Boulad was born in Alexandria, Egypt in 1931. His father comes from a Melkite Greek Catholic family of Syro-Lebanese descent, originally from Damascus, which settled in Egypt in 1860. The Boulad family belongs to the old Damascene bourgeoisie and has produced many clerics including Father Abdel Massih (Damascus) and Father Antoune Boulad (Monastery of the Holy Savior, Lebanon).

In 1950, Boulad entered the novitiate of the Jesuits in Bikfaya, Lebanon. He taught two years at the Collège de la Sainte Famille in Cairo. After a cycle of theological studies (from 1959 to 1963 in Lebanon), he was ordained a priest according to the Melkite rite. In 1965, he participated in a Jesuit training program in Pomfret, Connecticut and obtained a PhD in School psychology from the University of Chicago.

He returned to Egypt in 1967. He later became the religious superior of the Jesuits of Alexandria, then the provincial of the Jesuits of the Near East, and professor of theology in Cairo. In 2004, he became rector of CSF of Jesuits in Cairo.

He has been strongly committed to serving the poor, Christians and Muslims, a commitment that continues with his involvement in Caritas. From 1984 to 1995, he was director of Caritas Egypt, and president of Caritas North Africa and Middle East. From 1991 to 1995, he was Vice President of Caritas International for the Middle East and North Africa.

In 2007, he wrote a letter to Pope Benedict XVI entitled SOS for the Church today, which will be published in 2009. He calls for a revamp of the Church and proposes a theological and catechetical reform, a pastoral reform and a spiritual renewal, which should be discussed at a synod of the world church. In 2010, he urges Europe "not to lose its soul".

As a fine expert of Islam, which he has lived with since childhood in Egypt, he has been very critical of some of his contemporary orientations, while insisting that the dialogue between Christians and Muslims must continue, but not in its current form, which he argues is only lies and compromise, and therefore is not dialogue and exasperates it. Defender and human rights activist, he was a privileged observer of the Arab Spring, and particularly the Egyptian Revolution of 2011. He has called on the West not to give in to cynicism, to support people's aspirations for freedom, and not to ally themselves with religious fundamentalists.

Boulad has published nearly 30 books in 15 languages, particularly in French, Arabic, German and Hungarian.

He was promoted to the Commander of the Order of Academic Palms. In 2017, he received Hungarian citizenship and praised Hungary's current policy of defending traditional Christian communities in Europe and elsewhere as a sign for the future. In 2019 he received the Hungarian Order of Merit.

Bibliography (selection)
 Jésus de Nazareth : Qui es-tu ? (Éditions Anne Sigier, 2006) 
 Le Mystère de l’Être (Éditions Anne Sigier, 2006) 
 L'Islamisme (Fidelite, 2004, avec Philippe Lenoir, Charles Delhez et Joseph Maïla) 
 Changer le monde : Expérience mystique et engagement (Saint-Augustin, 2004) 
 Amour et Sexualité (Éditions Anne Sigier, 2003) 
 L'Amour Fou de Dieu (Éditions Anne Sigier, 2002) 
 L'Amour et le Sacré (Éditions Anne Sigier, 2002) 
 Chasteté et consécration (Éditions Anne Sigier, 2003) 
 Les dimensions de l'amour (Albin Michel, 1996) 
 La foi et le sens (Éditions Médiaspaul, 2014)

References
 Présentation et interview du Père Henri Boulad sur le Blog Copte
 Lettre à Benoit XVI : SOS pour l'Église d'aujourd'hui
 « La charia est en totale contradiction avec les principes mêmes de la  révolution arabe »

1931 births
Egyptian Jesuits
Melkite Greek Catholic Church in Egypt
Living people